The 1998 NCAA Division II Men's Soccer Championship was the 27th annual tournament held by the NCAA to determine the top men's Division II college soccer program in the United States.

Southern Connecticut State (20-2-1) defeated South Carolina–Spartanburg, 1–0, in the tournament final. This was the fifth national title for the Owls, who were coached by Tom Lang. This was also a rematch of the championship final from 1995, also won by SCSU.

Bracket

Final

See also  
 NCAA Division I Men's Soccer Championship
 NCAA Division III Men's Soccer Championship
 NAIA Men's Soccer Championship

References 

NCAA Division II Men's Soccer Championship
NCAA Division II Men's Soccer Championship
NCAA Division II Men's Soccer Championship
NCAA Division II Men's Soccer Championship